Bushmaster is the name of two fictional supervillains appearing in American comic books published by Marvel Comics. The first was a master criminal, while the second Bushmaster was given super powers as he had a long, mechanical snake tail grafted to his torso and bionic arms.

Mustafa Shakir portrayed the original version of Bushmaster, John McIver, in the Marvel Cinematic Universe, as part of the second season of the television series Luke Cage.

Publication history
The first Bushmaster (John McIver) first appeared in Iron Fist #15 (September 1977) created by writer Chris Claremont and writer/artist John Byrne. John McIver, known as John Bushmaster, became a Maggia crime boss in Europe and later expanded into the United States. In the United States, he was confronted by Misty Knight, Iron Fist and Power Man. Due to an accident during a fight with Power Man, Bushmaster was transformed into "Unliving metal", which later led to his death.

The second Bushmaster (Quincy McIver), first appeared in Captain America #310 (October 1985), created by Mark Gruenwald and Paul Neary. Quincy McIver, younger brother of John, lost both his arms and legs in a boating accident while trying to avoid the police. The Roxxon Oil Company used their resources to graft bionic arms to Quincy's body and replace his severed legs with a long bionic snake tail, transforming him into Bushmaster. He became a founding member of the Serpent Society, finding acceptance among the team. He would remain loyal to Society leader Sidewinder when Viper took control of the Serpent Society. He was not shown to be a member of Serpent Solutions when the Society was reorganized.

Fictional character biography

John McIver

John McIver was a powerful crime boss, criminal financier and organizer, and the brother of Quincy McIver. As a teenager, John and Quincy grew up on an unidentified island in the Caribbean Sea. Unlike Quincy, John was quick and savvy enough to stay out of trouble, despite stealing from local merchants. After John found out that Quincy blurted out that they were brothers to a shopkeeper who had caught him, John gave Quincy a beating. A few nights later, John beat the shopkeeper to death. Years later, John was in the employ of Herve Argosy where he worked as his muscle man in his gun-extorting business. John got Quincy in with Herve Argosy, but Quincy got all four limbs chopped off by a motorboat propeller on the first mission. John visited Quincy in the hospital to mock his misfortune. John McIver then took on the name John Bushmaster and headed off to Europe to run some of Argosy's trade there.

Several years later, John Bushmaster managed to take over the European branch of the Maggia. As he began to show interest into expanding into the United States starting with New York, he attracted the attention of the FBI, CIA, and Interpol where they have failed to infiltrate his organization. New York's district attorney sent Misty Knight to take a stab at it under the alias of Maya Korday. She did so successfully. Bushmaster returned early from his press conference and warmly greeted Maya at the Cutlass Bay resort on the Caribbean island of Ste. Emile.

Bushmaster agreed to put a hit out on Iron Fist for a man named Shrieve. Discovering this, an enraged Maya  used her bionic arm to force Bushmaster to tell her where the hit would occur. Maya then went to a boat where Bushmaster planned to see her dead.

Bushmaster sent his agents to capture Claire Temple and Noah Burstein. Bushmaster summoned Power Man to his mansion at Lake Michigan where he showed them the videos of the hostages and threatened to kill them if they didn't bring Misty Knight to him. In exchange, Bushmaster offered to give them videotapes provided by a technology user named Gadget that would prove his innocence for the crimes that Luke Cage was initially framed for. To make sure that Power Man followed his offer, Bushmaster sent Shades and Comanche to follow them. Power Man ended up fighting Misty Knight, Colleen Wing, and Iron Fist. When Luke Cage was seemingly defeated by Iron Fist, Shades and Comanche reported this to Bushmaster. At Seagate Prison, Bushmaster coerced Noah Burnstein into utilizing the "Power Man" process on him to an even greater extent that was used on Luke Cage. Power Man, Iron Fist, Misty Knight, and Colleen Wing fought Bushmaster at Seagate Prison where Bushmaster proved to be more powerful than Luke Cage. In the course of the battle, Power Man and Bushmaster pierced a chemical vat and were doused in chemicals which were then electrified by a torn power line. Bushmaster was believed killed in the resulting explosion.

Bushmaster survived and his body continued to mutate, transforming into unliving metal. While he still could move, Bushmaster had his agents capture Noah Burnstein's wife Emma to force Noah to reverse the process. His agents also captured Power Man and brought him to Seagate to be used as a guinea pig. Virtually immobile, Bushmaster watched as Noah Burnstein began the process. When Iron Fist arrived and shattered the tank to rescue Power Man, Bushmaster reached for a signal switch to order his men to kill Emma Burnstein, but as he did, his transformation accelerated and left him in an immobile inert steel form less than an inch from the switch. His body then began to crumble leaving only a metal skeleton.

Bushmaster's son Cruz Bushmaster had his father's remains taken to an island fortress off the coast of St. Croix so that he can have Noah Burnstein resolve the safety issues in the "Power Man" process. Cruz Bushmaster had his father's remains and Luke Cage placed in a chamber to absorb the negative effects of the "Power Man" process. John Bushmaster was revived by the energies and took over Cruz's body. John Bushmaster in Cruz' body goes by the name Power Master and attacks Luke Cage. In the nick of time, Iron Fist arrived and freed Luke Cage from Power Master's grip. Luke Cage then puts a power cable into Power Master who ends up soaking up the energy like a sponge. As Power Master started absorbing too much energy, Luke Cage and Iron Fist escaped while Cruz Bushmaster's fortress exploded.

Quincy McIver

Quincy McIver was born on a Caribbean island and is the younger brother of the first Bushmaster. He became a quadruple amputee when he lost his arms and legs in a boating accident while trying to evade the police underwater.

Shortly later, the Roxxon Oil Company equipped him with bionic arms and a snake-like tail in the place of the lower half of his body. He took the name "Bushmaster" from his fallen brother. Years later, Sidewinder enlisted Bushmaster to join the criminal trade union known as the Serpent Society. Bushmaster was grateful for the unity and the steady employment. After all, he considered himself to be a freak, and the Society was his best chance in life. In fact, he made a friend in Diamondback, a fellow Society member.

In his first mission with the Serpent Society, he was hired by AIM to hunt down MODOK. MODOK severed Bushmaster's artificial appendages, and Diamondback saved Bushmaster's life. He soon received new bionic arms.

After the Viper took over the Society, Bushmaster remained loyal to Sidewinder. He was poisoned by the Viper, but was saved by Captain America and Diamondback. He then participated in the Serpent Society's mission to recover mystic objects for Ghaur and Llyra. He withdrew from combat against the X-Men to repay his debt to Diamondback.

Sidewinder, disillusioned by the betrayals of some of the Serpents, had turned over control of the guild to the Cobra, and Bushmaster served him next. At Diamondback's trial, Bushmaster voted to spare her life from a death sentence. After the trial, Bushmaster fought Diamondback, and next, Captain America and Paladin. He was finally taken into custody. He was later released from the Vault.

During the 2006 "Civil War" storyline, Bushmaster is among the villains apprehended by Baron Zemo and forced to join Thunderbolts. He briefly appears along with fellow Serpent Society members King Cobra and Rattler.

Alyosha Kraven later began collecting a zoo of animal-themed superhumans, including Gargoyle, Tiger Shark, Kangaroo, Aragorn (the version that was owned by the Vatican Black Knight), Vulture, Mongoose, Man-Bull, Dragon Man, Swarm, Mandrill, Grizzly, Frog-Man, and Rhino. Bushmaster is apparently killed by Kraven and left face down in the water aboard the sinking ship.

Later, several Serpent Society members including Anaconda, Black Mamba, Bushmaster and Cottonmouth, fought members of the New Avengers in a semi-tropical locale. He was defeated by Ronin and Luke Cage.

During the "Avengers vs. X-Men" storyline, Bushmaster was seen with the Serpent Society where they were robbing a bank until they are defeated by Hope Summers.

As part of the All-New, All-Different Marvel initiative, Bushmaster appears as a member of Viper's Serpent Society under its new name of Serpent Solutions.

Bushmaster appears in the 2017 "Secret Empire" storyline where he and the rest of the Serpent Society are members of the Army of Evil. He alongside Puff Adder and Viper attack a woman in the woods when she is saved by a bearded haggard man in a World War II uniform that introduced himself as Steve Rogers.

Bushmaster then participated in a bank robbery with his teammates Sidewinder, Cottonmouth, and Anaconda, though it was quickly thwarted by the X-Men. He was later seen staying at the Owl's hideout among several other criminals with visual oddities.

In a prelude to the "Hunted" storyline, several members of the Serpent Society were captured by Kraven the Hunter, Taskmaster, and Black Ant and forced to participate in a murderous hunt set up by Arcade. Black Mamba, Cottonmouth, Bushmaster, Black Racer, Puff Adder, Rock Python, and Fer-de-Lance were placed in electric cages to wait for the hunt to commence.

Powers and abilities
The first Bushmaster had street-fighting skills. He later went through the same process that gave Luke Cage his powers which gave him superhuman strength and durability. As Power Master, he can absorb energies from other people.

The second Bushmaster was given bionic prosthetic limbs and a tail attached through surgery courtesy of the Roxxon Oil Company and Brand Corporation. His long, snake-like, superhumanly strong bionic tail enables him to move and strike at superhuman speed. He has two  "fangs" strapped to the back of each of his hands, which are needle sharp at the tips and contain a fast-acting poison derived from snake venom.

Other versions

Ultimate Marvel
 In the Ultimate universe, Bushmaster is a member of the gang called the Serpent Skulls. He served as a lieutenant of the group until he was killed by the Scourge of the Underworld.

Secret Wars (2015)
 During the 2015 "Secret Wars" storyline, a zombified version of Bushmaster (Quincy) resides in the Battleworld domain of the Deadlands was seen among several other villains enhanced by Ultron. During the final battle, he was killed by Janet van Dyne of the Valley of Doom.

In other media
 The Quincy McIver incarnation of Bushmaster appears in The Avengers: Earth's Mightiest Heroes as a member of the Serpent Society with a snake-like appearance.
 The John McIver incarnation of Bushmaster appears in Luke Cage, portrayed by Mustafa Shakir. This version is Jamaican and the son of Quincy McIver, who was betrayed and killed by his business partners, Maybelline "Mama Mabel" and Buggy Stokes. Additionally, John was injured amidst his parents' murder, but was rescued by his uncle Paul "Anansi" Mackintosh, who used nightshade root to save him. In the present, John intends to seek revenge on the Stokeses and take control of Harlem's criminal underworld from Mama Mabel and Buggy's granddaughter Mariah Dillard, gaining control of a Yardies offshoot called the Stylers in the process. After running afoul of Luke Cage, John fights back, staining Cage's reputation before resuming his attacks on Dillard, despite being berated by Anansi. In their rematch, John temporarily paralyzes Cage and leaves him for dead, but the latter survives. John subsequently kidnaps and forces Raymond "Piranha" Jones to help him steal her wealth and ownership of the Harlem's Paradise nightclub before killing him and mounting two failed attempts on Dillard's life before Cage eventually defeats John and the police take him into custody. However, John's right-hand Sheldon (portrayed by Kevin Mambo) helps him escape and forces Tilda Johnson to heal him. Learning Anansi was killed by Dillard, John attempts to kill her once more until he is defeated by Cage and forced to return to Jamaica to give Anansi a proper burial.

References

External links
 
 

Characters created by Chris Claremont
Characters created by John Byrne (comics)
Characters created by Mark Gruenwald
Characters created by Paul Neary
Comics characters introduced in 1977
Comics characters introduced in 1985
Fictional African-American people
Fictional characters with superhuman durability or invulnerability
Iron Fist (comics)
Luke Cage
Marvel Comics characters with superhuman strength
Marvel Comics cyborgs
Marvel Comics mutates
Marvel Comics supervillains